The 1933 Detroit City College Tartars football team represented Detroit City College (later renamed Wayne State University) as an independent during the 1933 college football season. In their second year under head coach Joe Gembis, the Tartars compiled a 2–5–1 record and were outscored opponents by a combined total of 130 to 56.

Schedule

References

Detroit City College
Wayne State Warriors football seasons
Detroit City College Tartars football